Goldmanella is a genus of flowering plants in the daisy family.

Species
There is only one known species, Goldmanella sarmentosa, native to Belize, Guatemala, Chiapas, Tabasco, and the Yucatán Peninsula.

References

Monotypic Asteraceae genera
Coreopsideae
Flora of Mexico
Flora of Central America